Cheremkhovo is a town in Irkutsk Oblast, Russia, located on the Trans-Siberian Railway.

History
Cheremkhovo was founded in 1772.

Administrative and municipal status
Within the framework of administrative divisions, Cheremkhovo serves as the administrative center of Cheremkhovsky District, even though it is not a part of it. As an administrative division, it is incorporated separately as the Town of Cheremkhovo—an administrative unit with the status equal to that of the districts. As a municipal division, the Town of Cheremkhovo is incorporated as Cheremkhovo Urban Okrug.

Economy
The town is one of the coal-mining towns in the Irkutsk coal basin.

Notable residents 

 Uladzimir Mackievič (born 1956), Belarusian philosopher, social and political activist, political prisoner

References

Notes

Sources

External links
Official website of Cheremkhovo 
Cheremkhovo Business Directory 
Transsib.ru. Facts about Cheremkhovo

Cities and towns in Irkutsk Oblast
Populated places established in 1772
Irkutsk Governorate